The discography of MercyMe, an American Christian rock band, includes 11 studio albums, two compilation albums, two video albums, and 28 singles. MercyMe, formed in 1994, released six independent albums from 1995–2000 before signing with INO Records and releasing their major label debut album, Almost There (2001). Almost There peaked at No. 37 on the Billboard 200 and No. 1 on the Billboard Christian Albums chart. The band released Spoken For, their second studio album, in 2002; it peaked at No. 2 on the Billboard Christian Albums chart and No. 41 on the Billboard 200. Its second single, "Word of God Speak", spent a record 23 weeks atop the Billboard Christian Songs chart. The album has been certified Gold by the Recording Industry Association of America (RIAA), and has sold over 550,000 copies. In 2003, mainstream radio interest in "I Can Only Imagine", the band's second single from Almost There, caused sales of the album to surge. "I Can Only Imagine" would peak at No. 5 on the Billboard Adult Contemporary chart and No. 71 on the Billboard Hot 100. Almost There was eventually certified triple Platinum by the RIAA, signifying shipments of over 3,000,000 copies, and has sold over 2.2 million copies in the United States.

In 2004, the band released their third album, Undone, which sold 55,000 copies in its first week, debuting at No. 12 on the Billboard 200 and at No. 1 on the Christian Albums chart. Undone earned a Gold certification from the RIAA in December 2004 and has sold over 627,000 copies in the United States. Its three singles all peaked inside the top three on the Christian Songs chart, with two of them ("Here with Me" and "Homesick") crossing over to the Adult Contemporary chart. The band released Coming Up to Breathe, their fourth studio album, in 2006. The album debuted at No. 13 on the Billboard 200 and at No. 1 on the Christian Albums chart with 58,000 copies sold in its first week. "Coming Up to Breathe" earned a Gold certification from the RIAA in 2007.

All That Is Within Me, the band's fifth studio album, was released in 2007. It sold over 84,000 copies in its first week, debuting at No. 15 on the Billboard 200 and at No. 1 on the Christian Albums chart., and was certified Gold by the RIAA in 2010. Their sixth studio album, The Generous Mr. Lovewell, was released in 2010 and sold 88,000 copies in its first week. It became their first top 10 album on the Billboard 200, debuting at No. 3. All three of its singles peaked at No. 1 on the Christian Songs chart, and the album has been certified Gold by the RIAA. MercyMe's seventh studio album, The Hurt & The Healer, sold 33,000 copies in its first week, debuting at No. 7 on the Billboard 200. Their 2014 studio album, Welcome to the New, debuted at No. 4 on the Billboard 200 chart, selling 26,000 copies in its first week.

Albums

Independent albums

Studio albums

Christmas albums

Compilation albums

Video albums

Other albums

Singles

As lead artist

As featured artist

Other charted songs

References
Notes

Footnotes

Discographies of American artists
Christian music discographies